Nainasya (also known as Maharajpura) is a patwar circle and village in ILRC Nimera in Phagi Tehsil in Jaipur district, Rajasthan. Nainasya (Including chittar ji patel ki dhani)is also a patwar circle for nearby villages, Gadooda and Sirsya.

In Nainasya, there are 82 households with total population of 594 (with 54.38% males and 45.62% females), based on 2011 census. Total area of village is 3.36 km2.  There is one primary school in Nainasya village.

References

Cities and towns in Jaipur district